"Underwater" is a song by Australian alternative dance group Rüfüs Du Sol, released on 10 August 2018 as the second single from their third studio album Solace (2018).

In November 2019, the song received a nomination for Best Dance Recording at the 62nd Annual Grammy Awards.

Reception
Sose Fuamoli from Triple J described "Underwater" as "an envelope pusher when it comes to production" adding "thumping beats and Tyrone Lindqvist's soaring vocals have pulled the band right back into our eyeline, front and centre."

Kat Benin from Billboard said ""Underwater" sounds like its title. It opens with blinking, repetitive synth, murky as if coming through depths of blue. A chorus of ghostly voices lures you deeper as singer Tyrone Lindqvist whispers you to move further away. You can't, of course. You're completely trapped by RÜFÜS' dark magic. If you like a little creepiness with your cool, dig that flatline beat at the end."

The song was voted in at #22 in the world's largest annual music poll, the Triple J Hottest 100, 2018.

Track listings

Charts

Certifications

Release history

References

2018 songs
2018 singles
Rüfüs Du Sol songs